The Little Marys River is a  tributary of the Marys River. It is located in Randolph County, Illinois, in the Interior River Valleys and Hills ecoregion,.

See also
 List of Illinois rivers

References

External links
Prairie Rivers Network

Rivers of Illinois
Tributaries of the Mississippi River
Rivers of Randolph County, Illinois